Without Fear or Blame or Sans peur et sans reproche is a French comedy film released in 1988. The film is directed by Gérard Jugnot.

Plot
At the end of the fifteenth century, the armies of King Charles VIII go through Italy to conquer the Kingdom of Naples. One of the French captains, Bellabre defeated and ridiculed in a parade tournament by a young unknown, Pierre Terrail de Bayard, takes under his control, to take revenge by making him know the harsh reality of war. But very quickly the aging Bellabre is overshadowed by the feats of the young warrior; he decided to devote himself to the glory that will become the Bayard knight without fear and without reproach.

Cast

Gérard Jugnot as Bellabre
 Rémi Martin as Pierre Terrail de Bayard
 Roland Giraud as Sottomayor
 Gérard Darmon as Jacques de Mailles
 Victoria Abril as Jeanne
  as Blanche de Savoie
 Ticky Holgado as Mignard de Parthode
 Martin Lamotte as Louis XII
 Anémone as Rose
 Josiane Balasko as A handmaid
 Michel Blanc as Verdiglione
 Patrick Timsit as Charles VIII
 Gérard Klein as De Fougas
 Jean-Louis Foulquier as Louis d'Ars
 Romain Bouteille as François de Paule
 Bruno Carette as Grégoire
 Carole Brenner as Bernardine
 Alain Doutey as D'Urfé

References

External links
 

1988 films
1988 comedy films
French comedy films
Films set in the 1490s
French parody films
1980s parody films
Films directed by Gérard Jugnot
1980s French films